Pierre Christin (born 27 July 1938) is a French comics creator and writer.

Biography 
Christin was born at Saint-Mandé in 1938.

After graduating from the Sorbonne, Christin pursued graduate studies in political science at SciencesPo and became a professor of French literature at the University of Utah, Salt Lake City. His first comics story, Le Rhum du Punch, illustrated by his childhood friend Jean-Claude Mézières, was published in 1966 in Pilote magazine.  Christin returned to France the following year to join the faculty of the University of Bordeaux. That year he again collaborated with Mézières to create the science-fiction series Valérian and Laureline for Pilote.  The first episode was Les Mauvais Rêves (Bad Dreams).

In addition to the ongoing Valerian, Christin has written several other comics one-shots, including The City That Didn't Exist (La Ville qui n'existe pas), The Black Order Brigade (Les Phalanges de l'ordre noir) and The Hunting Party (Partie de chasse) (all illustrated by Enki Bilal).  Among the many European comics artist he has collaborated with are Enki Bilal, Jacques Tardi, Alexis, Raymond Poïvet, Jijé, Annie Goetzinger, Daniel Ceppi, and François Boucq.  He has also written screenplays and science-fiction novels.

Awards
 1976: Angoulême International Comics Festival, Best French Author
 1986: Angoulême International Comics Festival, Library Readers Award, for La voyageuse de la petite ceinture
 1995: Haxtur Awards, Spain, nominated for Best Short Comic Strip, for El Círculo del poder (The Circles of Power)
 1997: Angoulême International Comics Festival, Tournesol Award, for Les otages de l’Ultralum (Hostages of the Ultralum)
 1996: Max & Moritz Prizes, Germany, Best International Writer
 2019: Angoulême International Comics Festival René Goscinny award

Notes

References
 Pierre Christin publications in Pilote BDoubliées 
 Pierre Christin albums Bedetheque

External links

 Pierre Christin biography on Lambiek Comiclopedia

1938 births
Living people
People from Saint-Mandé
French comics writers
Valérian and Laureline
French male writers
French graphic novelists